This is a list of the extreme points of Moldova: the points that are farther north, south, east or west than any other location, as well as the highest and lowest points in the country.

Extreme coordinates

Elevation extremes 
 Highest point: Bălănești Hill (429 or 430m) 
 Lowest point: Dniester river, same as East extreme (2m)

See also 
 Extreme points of Europe
 Extreme points of Earth
 Geography of Moldova

References

 
Lists of coordinates
Moldova
Geography of Moldova
Extreme